Clinidium jolyi is a species of ground beetle in the subfamily Rhysodinae. It was described by R.T. & J.R. Bell in 1985. It is known from Mérida state in western Venezuela; a specimen from Trujillo resembles Clinidium jolyi but might represent a distinct species. Specimens in the type series measure  in length.

References

Clinidium
Beetles of South America
Invertebrates of Venezuela
Endemic fauna of Venezuela
Beetles described in 1985